Breema is a form of bodywork that has been described as a cross between partner yoga and Thai massage. The techniques may be utilized in either a practitioner-recipient mode or solo as "Self-Breema." The practice is intended to bring body and mind together, and no strong exertions or muscular contortions are involved. Breema utilizes "Nine Principles of Harmony" which frame the practice, and are applicable to every situation in life. These principles are said to assist with mindfulness in daily life.

There are at least 300 exact Breema sequences.

References

Manual therapy
Massage therapy